Señorita Panamá 1995, the 13th Señorita Panamá pageant and 30th celebration of the Miss Panamá contest, was held in Teatro Anayansi Atlapa Convention Centre, Panama City, Panama, September 1995, after weeks of events. The winner of the pageant was Reyna del Carmen Royo Rivera.

The pageant was broadcast live on RPC-TV Panamá. About 16 contestants from all over Panama competed for the crown. At the conclusion of the final night of competition, outgoing titleholder 'Michele Jeanette Sage Navarrete of Panama Centro crowned Reyna del Carmen Royo Rivera of Panama Centro as the new Señorita Panamá.

Royo competed in the 45th edition of the Miss Universe 1996 pageant, which was held at the Aladdin Resort & Casino Theatre, Las Vegas, Nevada, U.S. on May 17, 1996.

Also Moreno Montero competed in  Miss World 1995, the 45th edition of the Miss World pageant, was held on 18 November 1995 for the fourth straight year at the Sun City Entertainment Centre in Sun City, South Africa. De León was supposed to compete in Miss Hispanidad 1996 but the contest was finally canceled and was sent to Miss Asia Pacific 1997 pageant held on December 6, 1997 in Davao City, Philippines.

Final result

Special awards

Jury 
Giselle Amelia González Aranda: Señorita Panamá 1992
Charlie Cuevas: Stylist

Contestants 
These are the competitors who were this year.

Election schedule
Thursday September Final night, coronation Señorita Panamá 1995

Candidates Notes
Patricia De León Did not compete in the Miss Hispanidad due to cancellation, but competed in Miss Asia Pacific 1997.
Karol Guevara competed in Miss Hawaiian Tropic International and won the Miss Photogenic award.
Betzy Jeannete Achurra was elected Miss Panamá International 1996 and competed in Miss International 1996 held on October 26, 1996 at the Kanazawa Kagekiza in Kanazawa, Ishikawa, Japan.
Mildred de Carmen Kincaid Adames was elected Miss Panamá Intercontinental 1998 and competed in Miss Intercontinental 1998 in Germany on April 23, 1998.
Janessy Contreras won the Queen of Panama Carnival in 2002.
Swany Castillo represented Panama in the Miss Teen Internacional 1996 and placed as 4th Runner-Up.
Michelle Krisko competed in Nuestra Belleza Internacional 1995 in Miami.

Historical significance
Panama Centro won Señorita Panamá for 18th time.

References

External links
  Señorita Panamá  official website

Señorita Panamá
1995 beauty pageants